Juklavatnet is a lake on the border of the municipalities of Kvinnherad and Ullensvang in Vestland county, Norway. The  lake lies just outside Folgefonna National Park and immediately to the west of the Nordre Folgefonna glacier. There is a dam on the western end of the lake which regulates the depth of the water so that it can be used for hydroelectric power generation. The lake is the largest reservoir that feeds into the Mauranger power station.

See also
List of lakes in Norway

References

Lakes of Vestland
Ullensvang
Kvinnherad
Reservoirs in Norway